Horace Wilson may refer to:

 Horace Hayman Wilson (1786–1860), English Orientalist
 Horace Wilson (professor) (1843–1927), American professor of English who introduced baseball to Japan
 Horace Wilson (politician) (1848–1903), mayor of Winnipeg, Manitoba
 Horace Wilson (cricketer) (1864–1923), Australian cricketer
 Horace Wilson (civil servant) (1882–1972), British government official